Coco's Lunch is an a cappella musical group based in Melbourne, Australia. The group was founded in 1994 by vocalists and multi-instrumentalists Lisa Young (voice, percussion) and Sue Johnson (voice, percussion), with Nicola Eveleigh (voice, percussion, flute), Jaqueline Gawler (voice, percussion), and Gabrielle MacGregor (voice, percussion). The group's sound is influenced by jazz, blues, classical, African and Carnatic traditions, and has been compared to artists such as Sweet Honey in the Rock and Bobby McFerrin.

In 2003, Coco's Lunch won the award for "Best Folk/World Song" at the Contemporary A Cappella Recording Awards for "Thulele Mama Ya", from the album A Whole New Way of Getting Dressed, which in turn was runner-up for the "Best Folk/World Album" category. In the same year, their song "All the Wild Wonders", written by Sue Johnson in collaboration with author Elizabeth Honey, was nominated for the category "Most Performed Jazz Work" in the APRA Music Awards of 2003.

Coco's Lunch received nominations at the ARIA Music Awards of 2007 in the category Best Children's Album for their album Rat Trap Snap and in the category Best World Music Album for their album Blueprint. In 2015, they won the "Best Song Composed or Originally Performed by (OPB) an AUS/NZ" category of the A Cappella Recording Awards, presented by Vocal Australia, for Lisa Young's song "Other Plans", which was also nominated for the category "Best Jazz Song".

Members
Current
 Jacqueline Gawler
 Emma Gilmartin
 Gabrielle MacGregor
 Lisa Young

Past
 Sue Johnson
 Nicola Eveleigh

Guest Members/Subs
 Libby O'Donovan
 Annemarie Sharry
 Miriam Crellin

Discography

Albums

Awards and nominations

ARIA Music Awards
The ARIA Music Awards is an annual awards ceremony that recognises excellence, innovation, and achievement across all genres of Australian music. They commenced in 1987.

! 
|-
| 2007
| Blueprint
| ARIA Award for Best World Music Album
| 
|rowspan="2" |
|-
| 2007
| Rat Trap Snap
| ARIA Award for Best Children's Album
| 
|-

References
Notes

Sources

External links
 Coco's Lunch website

Australian vocal groups
Musical groups established in 1994
Musical groups from Melbourne
Professional a cappella groups
Vocal quartets
Women's musical groups
1994 establishments in Australia
Women in Australia